The 2009 BC Lions season was the 52nd season for the team in the Canadian Football League and their 56th overall. The Lions finished the season in fourth place in the West Division with a disappointing 8–10 record after losing their last three regular season games. While it was their first losing record since 2001, they still managed to play in the East-Semi Final playoff game against the Hamilton Tiger-Cats after that same team eliminated the Winnipeg Blue Bombers in the last game of the season. The Lions would go on to play in the first East Final in franchise history, which they lost to the Montreal Alouettes. It was the sixth consecutive appearance for the Lions in a division final and the third consecutive season that their season was ended by the eventual Grey Cup champions.

Offseason

CFL draft 
The 2009 CFL Draft took place on May 2, 2009. The Lions traded their sixth and thirteenth overall picks for Hamilton's third overall pick in order to secure the chance to draft Bishop's running back Jamall Lee.

Preseason 

 Games played with white uniforms.

Regular season

Season standings

Season schedule 

 Games played with colour uniforms.
 Games played with white uniforms.
 Games played with alternate uniforms.
 Games played with retro uniforms.

Roster

Coaching staff

Player stats

Passing

Rushing

Receiving

Awards and records

 CFL's Most Outstanding Canadian Award – Ricky Foley, DE
 CFL's Most Outstanding Rookie Award – Martell Mallett, RB
 Commissioner's Award – Wally Buono

2009 CFL All-Stars
 DB – Korey Banks, CFL All-Star
 S – Barron Miles, CFL All-Star

Western Division All-Star selections
 RB – Martell Mallett, CFL Western All-Star
 SB – Geroy Simon, CFL Western All-Star
 ST – Jason Arakgi, CFL Western All-Star
 DT – Aaron Hunt, CFL Western All-Star
 LB – Anton McKenzie, CFL Western All-Star
 DB – Korey Banks, CFL Western All-Star
 S – Barron Miles, CFL Western All-Star

Milestones

Barron Miles recorded his 13th career blocked kick, on a convert attempt by Saskatchewan, on Aug 7, 2009 to become the leader in that category.
On Sept 19, 2009, head coach Wally Buono became the all-time most winningest coach in CFL history after a victory over the Toronto Argonauts.
On Nov 6, 2009, Barron Miles recorded his 66th career interception, tying Larry Highbaugh for second all time, finishing the season 21 behind Less Browne.

Playoffs

Schedule

 Games played with white uniforms.

Bracket

*=Team won in Overtime.

East Semi-Final 
Date and time: Sunday, November 15, 10:00 AM Pacific Standard TimeVenue: Ivor Wynne Stadium, Hamilton, Ontario

East Final 
Date and time: Sunday, November 22, 10:00 AM Pacific Standard TimeVenue: Olympic Stadium, Montreal, Quebec

References

BC Lions seasons
Bc Lions Season, 2009
2009 in British Columbia